There are two types of pathway for substitution of ligands in a complex. The ligand dependent pathway is the one whereby the chemical properties of the ligand affect the rate of substitution.  Alternatively, there is the ligand independent pathway, which is where the ligand does not have an effect.

This is of vital importance in the world of inorganic chemistry and complex ions.

References

Chemical bonding